An X engine is a piston engine with four banks of cylinders around a common crankshaft, such that the cylinders form an "X" shape when viewed from front-on.

The advantage of an X engine is that it is shorter than a V engine of the same number of cylinders, however the drawbacks are higher weight and complexity as compared to a radial engine. Therefore the configuration has been rarely used.

Several of the X engine designs were based on combining two V engines.

Examples 
Only two examples of X engines are known to have reached production. The first was the 1939–1942 Rolls-Royce Vulture, a  X-24 aircraft engine which was built using two Rolls-Royce Peregrine V12 engines. The Rolls-Royce Vulture was briefly used in the Avro Manchester heavy bomber, before engine failures caused it to be replaced by the Avro Lancaster (powered by the Rolls-Royce Merlin V12 engine).

The other production X engine is the ChTZ Uraltrac 12N360 X-12 engine, first produced in 2015, and used in the Russian Armata tank platform.

Several prototype 24-cylinder X engines for military aircraft were developed during World War II, including the Daimler-Benz DB 604, Rolls-Royce Exe and Isotta Fraschini Zeta R.C. 24/60, along with the 16-cylinder Napier Cub.

Other prototype X engines include a 1920s Ford X-8 automotive engine, which was investigated during the development process of the Ford Flathead V8 engine. During the 1960s, Honda is said to have experimented with an X-32 engine configuration for their Formula One racing efforts, but abandoned the design as being too complex and unreliable. From 2006 to 2010, the Revetec X4v1 and Revetec x4v2 X-4 experimental petrol engines were developed by an engine research company, followed in 2013 by the Revetec X4-D1 experimental petrol engine.

See also 
 Radial engine
 W engine

References

Piston engine configurations
 
Engines by cylinder layout